USS N-2 (SS-54) was a N-class coastal defense submarine built for the United States Navy during World War I.

Description
The N-class boats designed by Electric Boat (N-1 throughN-3) were built to slightly different specifications from the other N-class submarines, which were designed by Lake Torpedo Boat, and are sometimes considered a separate class. They displaced  on the surface and  submerged. The N-class submarines had a crew of 2 officers and 23 enlisted men.

For surface running, the Electric Boat submarines were powered by two  diesel engines, each driving one propeller shaft. When submerged each propeller was driven by a  electric motor. They could reach  on the surface and  underwater.

The boats were armed with four 18-inch (450 mm)  torpedo tubes in the bow. They carried four reloads, for a total of eight torpedoes.

Construction and career
N-2 was laid down on 29 July 1915 by Seattle Construction and Drydock Company. She was launched on 16 January 1917 sponsored by Mrs. Whitford Drake, and commissioned on 26 September 1917 with Lieutenant Hugh C. Frazer in command. Upon arriving at San Francisco, California, she was ordered to proceed to the East Coast via the Panama Canal, for assignment to the Submarine Force, U.S. Atlantic Fleet. She arrived at New London, Connecticut, on 7 February 1918 and almost immediately began to patrol along the New England coast, guarding against enemy submarines in this area for the remainder of the war.

Following the end of World War I, N-2 continued her operations out of New London, serving as a training ship for the Submarine School. Beginning in late May 1921, the submarine also tested experimental Navy weapons, such as a radio controlled torpedo, and evaluated its potential value in modern combat. Placed in reduced commission 22 April 1922, N-2 continued her training and experimental duties at New London. On 11 October, she aided tanker  grounded on the southern end of Block Island. She remained in active service until decommissioned 30 April 1926 at Philadelphia Navy Yard. Struck from the Naval Vessel Register on 18 December 1930, N-2 was scrapped in early 1931.

Notes

References

External links

 

United States N-class submarines
World War I submarines of the United States
Ships built in Seattle
1917 ships